The Roman Catholic Diocese of Boise Regions are deaneries for geographic areas of the state of Idaho. The areas are further defined by parishes, stations, and chapels. The Diocese of Boise is a suffragan of  the Roman Catholic Archdiocese of Portland.

Northern Deanery

Parishes

 Bonners Ferry - St. Ann's Parish
 Coeur D'alene - St. Thomas Parish
 Coeur D'alene - St. Pius X Parish
 Desmet - Sacred Heart Indian Mission Parish
 Kellogg - St. Rita's Parish
 Post Falls - St. George's Parish
 Priest River - St. Catherine Of Siena Parish
 Saint Maries - St. Mary Immaculate Parish
 Sandpoint - St. Joseph Parish
 Wallace - St. Alphonsus Parish

Stations
 Harrison - Our Lady Of Perpetual Help Station
 Priest Lake - St. Blanche Station
 Worley - St. Michael's Station

Chapels

 Coeur d'Alene -St. Joan of Arc Chapel
 Clark Fork - Sacred Heart Chapel
 Mullan - St. Michael's Chapel
 Plummer - Our Lady Of Perpetual Help Chapel
 Rathdrum - St. Stanislaus Chapel
 Spirit Lake - St. Joseph's Chapel

North-Central Deanery

Parishes

 Cottonwood - St. Mary's Parish
 Ferdinand - Assumption Parish
 Grangeville - Sts. Peter And Paul Parish
 Greencreek - St. Anthony's Parish
 Kamiah - St. Catherine Of Siena Parish
 Lewiston - St. Stanislaus Parish
 Lewiston - St. James Parish
 Lewiston - Our Lady Of Lourdes Parish
  Moscow - St. Mary's Parish
  Moscow - St. Augustine's Catholic Center Parish
 Orofino - St. Therese's Of The Little Flower Parish

Stations

 Genesee - St. Mary's Station
 Lapwai - Sacred Heart Station
 Nezperce - Holy Trinity Station
 Potlatch - St. Mary's Station

Chapels

 Keuterville - Holy Cross Chapel
 Pierce - Our Lady Of Woodland Chapel

West-Central Deanery

Parishes

 Boise - St. Mary's Parish
 Boise - St. Mark's Parish
 Boise - Church Of The Sacred Heart Parish
 Boise - Risen Christ Catholic Community Parish
 Boise - Our Lady Of The Rosary Parish
 Boise - St. John's Cathedral Parish
 Emmett - Sacred Heart Parish
 Mccall - Our Lady Of The Lake Parish
 Meridian - Holy Apostles Parish
 Mountain Home - Our Lady Of Good Counsel Parish
 Mountain Home - St. Mary's Of Mountain Home A.F.B. Parish

Stations

 Bruneau - St. Bridget's Station
 Cascade - St. Katharine Drexel Station
 Garden Valley - St. Jude's Station
 Glenns Ferry - Our Lady Of Limerick Station

Chapels

 Grand View - St. Henry's Chapel
 Horseshoe Bend - Our Lady Queen Of Angels Chapel
 Idaho City - St. Joseph's Chapel
 Riggins - St. Jerome's Chapel

Western Deanery

Parishes

 Caldwell - Our Lady Of The Valley Parish
 Fruitland - Corpus Christi Parish
 Nampa - St. Paul's Parish
 Weiser - St. Agnes Parish

Stations

 Cambridge - Holy Rosary Station
 Council - St. Jude The Apostle Station
 Melba - St. Joseph's Station

Chapels

 Homedale - St. Hubert's Chapel
 Oreana - Our Lady Queen Of Heaven Chapel
 Parma - Sacred Hearts Of Jesus And Mary Chapel
 Payette - Corpus Christi Chapel
 Silver City - Our Lady Of Tears Chapel

Southern Deanery

Parishes

 Buhl - Immaculate Conception Parish
 Burley - St. Therese's Little Flower Parish
 Gooding - St. Elizabeth's Parish
 Hailey - St. Charles Borromeo Parish
 Jerome - St. Jerome's Parish
 Rupert - St. Nicholas Parish
 Shoshone - St. Peter's Parish
 Sun Valley-Ketchum - Our Lady Of The Snows Parish
 Twin Falls - St. Edward The Confessor Parish

Stations

 Hagerman - St. Catherine's Station
 Wendell - St. Anthony's Station

Chapels

 Fairfield - Immaculate Conception Chapel
 Twin Falls - Our Lady Of Guadalupe Chapel

Eastern Deanery

Parishes

 Aberdeen/American Falls - Presentation Of The Lord Parish
 Blackfoot - St. Bernard's Parish
 Idaho Falls - Idaho Falls Catholic Community Parish
 Pocatello - Holy Spirit Catholic Community Parish
 Saint Anthony - Mary Immaculate Parish
 Salmon - St. Charles Parish
 Soda Springs - Good Shepherd Catholic Community Parish

Stations

 Arco - St. Ann's Station
 Challis - St. Louise Station
 Driggs - Good Shepherd Community Station
 Island Park - Chapel Of The Pines Station
 Mackay - St. Barbara's Station
 Mud Lake - St. Ann's Station
 Rexburg - St. Patrick's Station
 Roberts - St. Anthony's Station

Chapels

 Aberdeen - Blessed Sacrament Chapel
 American Falls - St. Mary's Chapel
 Chubbuck - St. Paul's Chapel
 Fort Hall - Blessed Kateri Tekakwitha Chapel
 Lava Hot Springs - Our Lady Of Lourdes Chapel
 Leadore - St. Joseph's Chapel
 Montpelier - Blessed Sacrament Chapel
 Pingree - St. John's Chapel
 Pocatello - St. Joseph's Chapel
 Pocatello - St. Anthony Of Padua Chapel
 Preston - St. Peter's Chapel
 Shelley - Our Lady Of Guadalupe Chapel
 Soda Springs - St. Mary's Chapel

See also
List of Roman Catholic dioceses
Roman Catholic Archdiocese of Portland

References